Nikolay Dimitrov may refer to:

 Nikolay Dimitrov (bobsleigh) (born 1963), Bulgarian Olympic bobsledder
 Nikolay Dimitrov (footballer, born 1970), Bulgarian former footballer
 Nikolay Dimitrov (footballer, born 1987), Bulgarian football winger
 Nikolay Dimitrov (footballer, born 1990), Bulgarian football defender
 Nikolay Dimitrov (wrestler), Bulgarian wrestler